Crónica TV is an Argentine news channel focused on live news reports. It is operated by Estrellas Producciones S.A. (Estrella Satelital) and owned by Héctor Ricardo García.

History
Rossana González and Gustavo Chapur led the initial broadcast of Crónica TV on 3 January 1994, and it became the first Argentine TV channel to broadcast 24 hours of news and live reports.

For the past 10 years the channel has been the leader in ratings, beating Todo Noticias also in coverage and breaking news.

The channel is well known in Argentina for its populist character and its bizarre treatment of information. Its trademark is the use of red screens and big white letters to announce breaking news, accompanied by the US military march "The Stars And Stripes Forever". Sometimes the news titles border on foolishness; one September 22, the channel announced: 364 days left to the next spring.

Controversy

"Malevo" Ferreyra suicide
On 21 November 2008 the channel entered controversy, after being witnesses to and broadcasting "live" the suicide of Mario Oscar "Malevo" Ferreyra, an ex-officer of the Tucumán Police Department who was presumed to be a serial killer. This occurred some minutes before Ferreya was to be transported by the Argentine National Gendarmerie to a trial. This was the first time that a suicide was broadcast live on Argentine television.

Apu image controversy
On 30 November 2018, Crónica came under fire for displaying an image of The Simpsons character Apu Nahasapeemapetilon while reporting on the arrival of Indian Prime Minister Narendra Modi to Buenos Aires for the G20 summit.

References

24-hour television news channels in Argentina
Television channels and stations established in 1994
Spanish-language television stations
1994 establishments in Argentina